is a railway station on the Senmō Main Line in Kiyosato, Hokkaido, Japan, operated by the Hokkaido Railway Company (JR Hokkaido). It is numbered B67.

Lines

Adjacent stations

History
It was renamed Midori Station on 10 April 1956.

Surrounding area
 Midori Post office

References

External links

 JR Hokkaido Midori Station information 

Railway stations in Japan opened in 1931
Railway stations in Hokkaido Prefecture